El Moudjahid is an Algerian French-language newspaper. It was founded during the Algerian War to inform FLN resistance fighters, and after independence it became the newspaper of the single-party FLN government. Since the FLN was voted out of power in 1991, the newspaper is no longer affiliated with that party.

History and profile
El Moudjahid was originally conceived as an FLN guerrilla information bulletin during the 1954-62 Algerian War, circulated among resistance fighters. Its name, a French transliteration of the Arabic مجاهد (Mujahid), means "holy warrior", which the FLN called its fighters. Noted writer, activist and psychiatrist Frantz Fanon wrote for the newspaper during his life.

After the war, in 1962 this became the chief newspaper of Algeria. It served as a propaganda organ for the single-party FLN government. When Algeria opened up its closed system in 1988 and allowed for the publication of independent newspapers, El Moujahid continued to publish. Today it is a state newspaper, but its ties with the FLN were cut after the party was voted out of power in the 1991 elections.

It is published daily, except Fridays, which in Algeria is the weekly holiday. The paper's headquarters are on the Algiers seafront, near the parliament and central bank.

Omar Belhouchet, an award-winning journalist, worked at El Moudjahid early in his career. In 1990 he left with nineteen colleagues to found the independent El Watan.

See also
List of newspapers in Algeria

References

1962 establishments in Algeria
Publications established in 1962
French-language newspapers published in Algeria
Newspapers published in Algeria
Mass media in Algiers